Grenville is a borough of the municipality of Grenville-sur-la-Rouge in Quebec, Canada, located on the left bank of the Ottawa River.

History
Prior to April 24, 2002, it was an independent township municipality.  On that date it merged with the village municipality of Calumet to form a new municipality which took the name Grenville-sur-la-Rouge, and each of the two components became boroughs of the new municipality.

The village municipality that shares the name "Grenville" remained independent; it borders on Grenville-sur-la-Rouge but is not part of it.

The name "Grenville" comes from William Wyndham Grenville, a British statesman who served briefly as British prime minister (1806–1807). While Canada was still under British rule, a canal was built by the military to bypass a series of rapids in the Ottawa River. The canal and the settlement that arose in the region were named in Lord Grenville's honour.

References

Boroughs of Quebec
Former municipalities in Quebec
Populated places disestablished in 2002